Acoma is an extinct town in Lincoln County, in the U.S. state of Nevada.

A variant name is Acoma Station.

The name was probably transferred from the older settlement in New Mexico.  The name probably means people of the white rock in the Keres language.

History
In spring, 1904, the Utah and Eastern Copper Company started mining in the area.

The first settlement at Acoma was made about 1905. A post office was in operation at Acoma from 1905 until 1913.

In 1941, the Acoma had a population of 15.

References

Ghost towns in Lincoln County, Nevada